Vizura is the name of several sports teams from Belgrade, Serbia:
OK Vizura, women's volleyball team
KK Vizura, defunct men's basketball team (2003–2009)
KK Mega Vizura, a former name of men's basketball team now known as KK Mega Basket
Vizura Sports Center, basketball hall in Belgrade